Mole Sisters is an animated TV series released on February 28, 2003. It teaches preschoolers to respect the natural world around them. It is based on the book series written and illustrated by Roslyn Schwartz, and follows the adventures of two moles as they explore their environment. The series is produced by Funbag Animation Studios and Helix Animation. The show was commended for not only teaching respect for the environment, but for teaching respect for those around people, which is demonstrated in the sisters' relationship and the way they help each other throughout the series.

External links
 Mole Sisters website on Treehouse TV

2000s British animated television series
2010s British animated television series
2003 British television series debuts
2011 British television series endings
2000s Canadian animated television series
2010s Canadian animated television series
2003 Canadian television series debuts
2011 Canadian television series endings
Treehouse TV original programming
British children's animated adventure television series
Canadian children's animated adventure television series
British television shows based on children's books
Canadian television shows based on children's books
Fictional moles
Animated television series about mammals
Animated television series about sisters
British preschool education television series
Canadian preschool education television series
Animated preschool education television series
2000s preschool education television series
2010s preschool education television series